In mathematics, iterated forcing is a method for constructing models of set theory by repeating Cohen's forcing method a transfinite number of times. They also showed that iterated forcing can construct models where Martin's axiom holds and the continuum is any given regular cardinal.

In iterated forcing, one has a transfinite sequence Pα of forcing notions indexed by some ordinals α, which give a family of Boolean-valued models VPα. If α+1 is a successor ordinal then  Pα+1 is often constructed from Pα using a forcing notion in VPα, while if α is a limit ordinal then Pα is often constructed as some sort of limit (such as the direct limit) of the Pβ for β<α.

A key consideration is that, typically, it is necessary that  is not collapsed. This is often accomplished by the use of a preservation theorem such as:
 Finite support iteration of c.c.c. forcings (see countable chain condition) are c.c.c. and thus preserve .
 Countable support iterations of proper forcings are proper (see Fundamental Theorem of Proper Forcing) and thus preserve .
 Revised countable support iterations of semi-proper forcings are semi-proper and thus preserve .

Some non-semi-proper forcings, such as Namba forcing, can be iterated with appropriate cardinal collapses while preserving  using methods developed by Saharon Shelah.

References

Sources

External links

Forcing (mathematics)